Belanger is an unincorporated community within the Rural Municipality of Maple Creek No. 111, Saskatchewan, Canada. The community is located on Highway 706 50 km south of Maple Creek.

See also 
 List of communities in Saskatchewan

References 

Maple Creek No. 111, Saskatchewan
Unincorporated communities in Saskatchewan
Ghost towns in Saskatchewan
Division No. 4, Saskatchewan